Termination of employment or separation of employment is an employee's departure from a job and the end of an employee's duration with an employer. Termination may be voluntary on the employee's part, or it may be at the hands of the employer, often in the form of dismissal (firing) or a layoff. Dismissal or firing is usually thought to be the employee's fault, whereas a layoff is generally done for business reasons (for instance, a business slowdown, or an economic downturn) outside the employee's performance.

Firing carries a stigma in many cultures and may hinder the jobseeker's chances of finding new employment, particularly if they have been terminated from a previous job. Jobseekers sometimes do not mention jobs from which they were fired on their resumes; accordingly, unexplained gaps in employment, and refusal or failure to contact previous employers are often regarded as "red flags".

Dismissal

Dismissal is when the employer chooses to require the employee to leave, usually for the reason that is the employee's fault. The most common colloquial terms for dismissal in the United States are "getting fired" or "getting canned" whereas in the United Kingdom the terms "getting the sack" or "getting sacked" are also used.

Layoff

A less severe form of involuntary termination is often referred to as a layoff (also redundancy or being made redundant in British English). A layoff is usually not strictly related to personal performance but instead due to economic cycles or the company's need to restructure itself, the firm itself going out of business, or a change in the function of the employer (for example, a certain type of product or service is no longer offered by the company, and therefore jobs related to that product or service are no longer needed). One type of layoff is the aggressive layoff; in such a situation, the employee is laid off but not replaced as the job is eliminated.

In an economy based on at-will employment, such as that of the United States, a large proportion of workers may be laid off at some time in their life, and often for reasons unrelated to performance or ethics. Employment termination can also result from a probational period, in which both the employee and the employer agree that the employer is allowed to lay off the employee if the probational period is not satisfied.

Often, layoffs occur as a result of "downsizing", "reduction in force" or "redundancy". These are not technically classified as firings; laid-off employees' positions are terminated and not refilled because either the company wishes to reduce its size or operations or lacks the economic stability to retain the position. In some cases, a laid-off employee may eventually be offered their old position again by their respective company, though by this time, they may have found a new job.

Some companies resort to attrition (voluntary redundancy) as a means to reduce their workforce. Under such a plan, no employees are forced to leave their jobs. However, those who do depart voluntarily are not replaced. Additionally, employees may resign in exchange for a fixed amount of money, frequently a few years of their salary. Such plans have been carried out by the United States Federal Government under President Bill Clinton during the 1990s, and by the Ford Motor Company in 2005.

However, "layoff" may be specifically addressed and defined differently in the contract articles in the case of unionised work.

Termination by mutual agreement
Some terminations result from a mutual agreement between the employer and the employee. When this happens, it is sometimes debatable if the termination was indeed mutual. In many of these cases, it was initially the employer's wish for the employee to depart, but the employer offered the mutual termination agreement to soften the firing (as in a forced resignation). But there are also times when a termination date is agreed upon before the employment starts (as in an employment contract).

Some types of termination by the mutual agreement include:
The end of an employment contract for a specified period (such as an internship)
Mandatory retirement. Some occupations, such as commercial airline pilots, face mandatory retirement at a certain age.
Forced resignation

Changes of conditions
Firms that wish for an employee to exit of their own accord but do not wish to pursue firing or forced resignation may degrade the employee's working conditions, hoping that they will leave "voluntarily".

The employee may be moved to a different geographical location, assigned to an undesirable shift, given too few hours if part-time, demoted (or relegated to a menial task), or assigned to work in uncomfortable conditions. Other forms of manipulation may be used, such as being unfairly hostile to the employee and punishing them for things other employees deliberately overlook.

Often, these tactics are done so the employer will not have to fill out termination papers in jurisdictions without at-will employment. In addition, with a few exceptions, employees who voluntarily leave generally cannot collect unemployment benefits.

Such tactics may amount to constructive dismissal, which is illegal in some jurisdictions.

Pink slip 

Pink slip refers to the American practice, by a human resources department, of including a discharge notice in an employee's pay envelope to notify the worker of their involuntary termination of employment or layoff.

The "pink slip" has become a metonym for the termination of employment in general. According to an article in The New York Times, the editors of the Random House Dictionary have dated the term to at least as early as 1910.

The phrase may have originated in vaudeville. When the United Booking Office (established in 1906) would issue a cancellation notice to an act, the notice was on a pink slip. Another possible etymology is that many applications (including termination papers) are done in triplicate form, with each copy on a different color of paper, one of which is typically pink.

In the UK and, until 1 January 2019 in Ireland, the equivalent of a pink slip is a P45; in Belgium the equivalent is known as a C4.

Rehire following termination

Depending on the circumstances, a person whose employment has been terminated may not be able to be rehired by the same employer.

If the decision to terminate was the employee's, the willingness of the employer to rehire is often contingent upon the employee's relationship with the employer, the amount of notice given by the employee before departure, and the employer's needs. In some cases, when an employee departs on good terms, they might be given special priority by the employer when seeking to rehire.

An employee who an employer fired may not be eligible for rehire by the same employer, although in some cases, it is usually related to staffing issues.

Employment can be terminated without prejudice, meaning the fired employee may be rehired for the same job in the future. This is usually true in the case of layoff.

Conversely, a person's employment can be terminated with prejudice, meaning an employer will not rehire the former employee for the same job in the future. This can be for many reasons: incompetence, policy violation, misconduct (such as dishonesty or "zero tolerance" violations), insubordination, or "attitude" (personality clashes with peers or bosses).

Termination forms ("pink slips") routinely include a set of check boxes where a supervisor can indicate "with prejudice" or "without prejudice".

For example, public school teachers in New York who are laid off are placed on a Preferred Eligible List for employment in the school district where they were laid off for seven years from the date of layoff. If a teacher who was laid off applies to fill a job opening, they are given priority over other applicants.

See also 
 Employee offboarding
 Labour law
 Letter of resignation
 Termination of Employment Convention, 1982
 Turnover (employment)
 Wrongful termination

References

External links

Chartered Institute of Personnel and Development resources on dismissal in the UK